Scoyenia is an ichnogenus found in paleozoic-mesozoic strata in North America. It appears to be the preserved remains of animal burrows.

See also
 Ichnology

Burrow fossils